The 1912 Football Association Charity Shield was played on 4 May 1912. The game was played at White Hart Lane, home of Tottenham Hotspur, and was contested by the Football League champions Blackburn Rovers and the winners of the Southern League championship, Queens Park Rangers. The game ended in a 2–1 win for Blackburn Rovers, and the proceeds of the match were donated to the Titanic Relief Fund.

Match details

References

FA Community Shield
Charity Shield
Charity Shield 1912
Charity Shield 1912
FA Charity Shield
FA Charity Shield